The men's pole vault event at the 1981 Summer Universiade was held at the Stadionul Naţional in Bucharest on 22 and 23 July 1981.

Medalists

Results

Qualification
Qualifying mark: 5.00 m

Final

References

Athletics at the 1981 Summer Universiade
1981